Big Blue is a Canadian animated television series created by Gyimah Gariba.

Plot 
Set in an underwater world where humans live alongside anthropomorphic sea creatures, the show is about the crew of the United Current submarine Calypso, composed of the Sibling Team Lettie and Lemo (who are the crew's captain and science officer, respectively), a laidback turtle named Freddie (the ship's mechanic), a nervous dolphin named Phil (the resident medic), and Bacon Berry, a childlike magical guardian of mysterious origin and power. Under the command of the diminutive Admiral Krill and his number two Commander Plink, they explore the seas and take on missions to defend the ocean from various threats, most prominently a sapient mass of pollution known as The Blegh that seeks to corrupt all of the Big Blue, while helping to redefine what a family means and how caring for one another is the most important thing of all.

Characters

Main characters  
 Lettie (voiced by Bahia Watson) - the captain of the Calypso Crew who takes life and her responsibility seriously and does hate Lemo's antics, but she can pull her crew out of sticky situations She also has a soft side on Bacon Berry and is best friends with Commander Plink.
 Lemo (voiced by Kevin Duhaney) - the chief scientist and Lettie's little brother who often builds new inventions especially if they are not needed or wanted. He uses his "Lemo Logic" to solve problems in the episodes "Losing Lemo" and "Now You Sea Ghosts, Now You Don’t".
 Phil (voiced by Jeremy Harris) - an anthropomorphic medic bottlenose dolphin of the Calypso Crew, who sometimes gets nervous about missions but he is brave and loyal whenever he helps his crew mates. In the episode, "Fraidy Phil", it is revealed that he has a huge fear of sea spiders, and in "Captain Bossy Fins" his parents are seen for the first time.
 Freddie (voiced by Tal Shulman) - an anthropomorphic mechanic green sea turtle of the Calypso Crew who is laid back and annoyed, but he can help fix anything in the Calypso when it goes wrong. In the episode "Dodge Bubble", it is revealed that he used to play dodgeball (or dodge bubble in this instance).
 Bacon Berry or BB (voiced by Tianna Macduff Gibson) - the newborn guardian of the Big Blue and the Calypso Crew who has powers of the ocean. She sacrifices herself in order to save the Big Blue from the evil Blegh in the season finale "Return of the Blegh", which leads to the result of her transformation into flowers, and a new orb that she was born in appears at the end of the season finale with her eyes in it, which is a sign that she will return in Season 2.

Supporting characters 
 Admiral Krill (voiced by A.C. Peterson) - an anthropomorphic krill who is in charge of United Current.
 Commander Plink (voiced by Ana Sani) - Admiral Krill's number two of United Current and Lettie's best friend. In "Revenge of the Sibs", she has an adoptive family of angelfish.
  Mira Clearwater (voiced by Shannon Hamilton) - an anthropomorphic manta ray captain and rival of Lettie since they were cadets.
 King Puffypants (voiced by Jonathan Wilson) - an anthropomorphic pufferfish who is king of Pufferia; a kingdom with pufferfish.
 Remo (voiced by Jeremy Harris) - An anthropomorphic remora who is a very serious science officer.

Villains 
 The Blegh (voiced by Ron Rubin) - A sentient ooze whose goal is to pollute the Big Blue, destroy the Guardian, and take over the world. He was destroyed by Bacon Berry's sacrifice in the season finale "Return of the Blegh".
 Captain No Beard (voiced by Neil Crone) - a shark pirate.
 Spoony (voiced by Neil Crone) - Captain No Beard's first mate pirate red-bellied piranha.
 Cuddles (voiced by Brandon McGibbon) - An octopus thief.

Broadcast 

Big Blue first premiered on CBC Kids on December 4, 2021, at 10:15 AM EST, airing the first two episodes Goo in the Loo and Let's Get Krakken.

Shortly after, the series would premiere on Nicktoons in the United Kingdom and Ireland on January 10, 2022, at 8:00 AM BST on weekdays, with repeats being shown at 6:00 PM BST on weekends. It should also be noted that a sneak peek of the series aired in December, a month prior to the premiere in the United Kingdom.

On February 14, 2022, the series premiered on ABC Me at 4:20pm AEDT.

The series premiered on Cartoon Network in Africa on March 7, 2022, at 7:30 AM CAT.

The series subsequently aired on EBS 1 (South Korea), Boing (France), NRK Super (Norway), CTC Kids (Russia) and Panda KIDS (Portugal).

Streaming 

The series was made available of CBC's CBC Gem service shortly after the premier of the series in Canada.

In the United Kingdom, the series is available to watch on Sky Kids, Sky Go and Now.

In Australia, the series is available to stream on ABC iview.

Episodes

Season 1 (2021–2022)

Season 2 (2023)

References

External links 
  at Guru Studio.com
  at NickALive!.com
  at Complex.com
 at CBC Kids
 at Big Blue TV show.com

2020s Canadian animated television series
2020s Canadian children's television series
2021 Canadian television series debuts
Animated television series about children
Canadian children's animated adventure television series
Canadian children's animated comedy television series
Canadian flash animated television series
CBC Kids original programming
English-language television shows
Animated television series about fish